The 2013 BetVictor World Matchplay was the 20th annual staging of the darts tournament, the World Matchplay, organised by the Professional Darts Corporation. The tournament took place from 20 to 28 July 2013 at the Winter Gardens, Blackpool.

Phil Taylor was the defending champion, having won the last five stagings of the event, and he won his sixth consecutive World Matchplay title and 14th in total by defeating Adrian Lewis 18–13 in the final. His average of 111.23 in the final is the highest ever in a World Matchplay final.

For the first time since the 2009 Las Vegas Desert Classic, the top four players in the world all reached the semi-final stage.

Prize money
For the fifth consecutive World Matchplay, the prize fund was £400,000.

Format
In the previous stagings of the event all games had to be won by two clear legs with no sudden-death legs. However, this year, after consulting the host broadcaster Sky Sports, the PDC decided that games will now only proceed for a maximum of six extra legs before a tie-break leg is required. For example, in a best of 19 legs first round match, if the score reaches 12–12 then the 25th leg will be the decider.

Qualification
The top 16 in the PDC Order of Merit qualified as seeded players. The other 16 places went to the top 16 non-qualified players from the PDC ProTour Order of Merit who are unseeded players.

PDC Top 16
  Phil Taylor (winner)
  Michael van Gerwen (semi-finals)
  Adrian Lewis (runner-up)
  James Wade (semi-finals)
  Simon Whitlock (quarter-finals)
  Andy Hamilton (quarter-finals)
  Wes Newton (first round)
  Raymond van Barneveld (second round)
  Justin Pipe (quarter-finals)
  Dave Chisnall (quarter-finals)
  Robert Thornton (first round)
  Kevin Painter (second round)
  Mervyn King (first round)
  Brendan Dolan (second round)
  Kim Huybrechts (first round)
  Terry Jenkins (second round)

PDC ProTour qualifiers
  Jamie Caven (second round)
  Peter Wright (second round)
  John Part (first round)
  Stuart Kellett (first round)
  Paul Nicholson (first round)
  Gary Anderson (second round)
  Ronnie Baxter (first round)
  Colin Lloyd (first round)
  Steve Beaton (first round)
  Andy Smith (first round)
  Ian White (second round)
  Jelle Klaasen (first round)
  Jamie Lewis (first round)
  Ronny Huybrechts (first round)
  Mensur Suljović (first round)
  Mark Webster (first round)

Draw

Statistics
{|class="wikitable sortable" style="font-size: 95%; text-align: right"
|-
! Player
! Eliminated
! Played
! Legs Won
! Legs Lost
! LWAT
! 100+
! 140+
! 180s
! High checkout
! 3-dart average
|-
|align="left"|  Phil Taylor
| Winner
| 5
| 75
| 48
| 26
| 181
| 92
| 31
| 161
| 105.81
|-
|align="left"|  Adrian Lewis
| Final
| 5
| 72
| 60
| 25
| 152
| 92
| 56
| 161
| 97.52
|-
|align="left"|  Michael van Gerwen
| Semi-finals
| 4
| 54
| 38
| 18
| 96
| 78
| 26
| 164
| 102.06
|-
|align="left"|  James Wade
| Semi-finals
| 4
| 53
| 50
| 21
| 122
| 82
| 24
| 146
| 97.76
|-
|align="left"|  Andy Hamilton
| Quarter-finals
| 3
| 40
| 27
| 14
| 81
| 41
| 17
| 170
| 96.39
|-
|align="left"|  Simon Whitlock
| Quarter-finals
| 3
| 39
| 36
| 16
| 90
| 57
| 19
| 130
| 96.34
|-
|align="left"|  Justin Pipe
| Quarter-finals
| 3
| 33
| 29
| 12
| 88
| 31
| 23
| 170
| 96.19
|-
|align="left"|  Dave Chisnall
| Quarter-finals 
| 3
| 34
| 34
| 12
| 87
| 51
| 21
| 144
| 96.13
|-
|align="left"|  Terry Jenkins
| Second round
| 2
| 22
| 17
| 9
| 37
| 35
| 16
| 118
| 95.99
|-
|align="left"|  Gary Anderson
| Second round
| 2
| 19
| 18
| 10
| 51
| 25
| 4
| 121
| 95.55
|-
|align="left"|  Peter Wright
| Second round
| 2
| 13
| 17
| 4
| 45
| 19
| 6
| 96
| 95.40
|-
|align="left"|  Raymond van Barneveld
| Second round
| 2
| 19
| 17
| 8
| 49
| 26
| 7
| 121
| 94.70
|-
|align="left"|  Ian White
| Second round
| 2
| 17
| 16
| 5
| 34
| 25
| 7
| 125
| 92.85
|-
|align="left"|  Jamie Caven
| Second round
| 2
| 20
| 21
| 7
| 44
| 24
| 10
| 109
| 92.14
|-
|align="left"|  Brendan Dolan
| Second round
| 2
| 15
| 21
| 8
| 51
| 28
| 5
| 170
| 91.90
|-
|align="left"|  Kevin Painter
| Second round
| 2
| 20
| 20
| 7
| 51
| 20
| 10
| 164
| 91.56
|-
|align="left"|  Wes Newton
| First round
| 1
| 8
| 10
| 2
| 23
| 12
| 6
| 87
| 97.35
|-
|align="left"|  Colin Lloyd
| First round
| 1
| 7
| 10
| 2
| 22
| 12
| 3
| 120
| 93.92
|-
|align="left"|  Robert Thornton
| First round
| 1
| 3
| 10
| 1
| 20
| 8
| 3
| 60
| 92.59
|-
|align="left"|  Kim Huybrechts
| First round
| 1
| 4
| 10
| 1
| 14
| 9
| 1
| 62
| 91.59
|-
|align="left"|  Mensur Suljović
| First round
| 1
| 4
| 10
| 2
| 22
| 5
| 1
| 120
| 89.56
|-
|align="left"|  Ronnie Baxter
| First round
| 1
| 1
| 10
| 0
| 17
| 3
| 0
| 76
| 88.87
|-
|align="left"|  John Part
| First round
| 1
| 8
| 10
| 2
| 16
| 7
| 4
| 104
| 88.28
|-
|align="left"|  Jamie Lewis
| First round
| 1
| 7
| 10
| 2
| 20
| 5
| 4
| 104
| 88.14
|-
|align="left"|  Mervyn King
| First round
| 1
| 5
| 10
| 2
| 20
| 8
| 1
| 61
| 87.56
|-
|align="left"|  Jelle Klaasen
| First round
| 1
| 8
| 10
| 4
| 17
| 12
| 3
| 158
| 87.30
|-
|align="left"|  Steve Beaton
| First round
| 1
| 8
| 10
| 5
| 29
| 8
| 0
| 118
| 87.04
|-
|align="left"|  Mark Webster
| First round
| 1
| 4
| 10
| 1
| 17
| 4
| 3
| 101
| 86.39
|-
|align="left"|  Ronny Huybrechts
| First round
| 1
| 5
| 10
| 2
| 14
| 10
| 2
| 80
| 85.03
|-
|align="left"|  Andy Smith
| First round
| 1
| 3
| 10
| 2
| 21
| 7
| 0
| 116
| 84.90
|-
|align="left"|  Paul Nicholson
| First round
| 1
| 8
| 10
| 3
| 27
| 9
| 1
| 80
| 84.71
|-
|align="left"|  Stuart Kellett
| First round
| 1
| 1
| 10
| 0
| 7
| 3
| 2
| 18
| 75.82
|-

References

External links
 Official website

World Matchplay (darts)
World Matchplay
World Matchplay
World Matchplay